, is a Japanese actress. She graduated from Horikoshi High School on February 18, 2008. She began attending Asia University in April 2008.

Filmography

Drama
Don't Forget Me | Dai Renai: Boku o Wasureru Kimi to (TBS / 2018) - Yuzuka Sawada
Aino Mating Agency Inc | Aino Kekkon Soudanjo (TV Asahi / 2017) - Kana Sawamine (ep.6)
I Love You Just a Little Bit | Anata no Koto wa Sorehodo  (TBS/ 2017) - Rumi Mori
The Last Cop (NTV / 2016) - Saori Kashiwagi
Comes Morning | Asa ga Kuru (Fuji TV-Tokai TV / 2016) - Konomi Hirata
Money Angel | Mane no Tenshi  (YTV-NTV / 2016) - Mika Shirai (ep.3)
Aibou: Season 14 (TV Asahi / 2015-2016) - Sayumi Yajima (ep.12)
The Concierge | Hoteru Konsheruju (TBS / 2015)- Shiori Miyama (ep.5)
DOCTORS 3: The Ultimate Surgeon | DOCTORS 3 Saikyou no Meii  TV Asahi / 2015) - Ami Aihara
Cinderella Date (Tokai TV-Fuji TV / 2014) - Erika Tanaka
Kurofuku Monogatari (TV Asahi / 2014) - Ayano
Last Doctor | Rasuto Dokuta - Kansatsui Akita no Kenshi Hokoku (TV Tokyo / 2014) - Koiso (ep.7)
Woman of Maruho | Maruho no Onna - Hoken Hanzai Chosain (TV Tokyo / 2014) - Aoi Akamine (ep.3)
DOCTORS 2: The Ultimate Surgeon | DOCTORS 2 Saikyou no Meiklejohn  (TV Asahi / 2013) - Ami Aihara
Confirmation-Grand Theft Squad 3 | Kakusho～Keishicho Sousa 3 Ka (TBS / 2013) - Minayo Tomosaka
Sousa Chizu no Onna (TV Asahi / 2012) - Reiko Saotome / Koharu (ep.3)
Dr. Ume-chan | Umechan Sensei (NHK / 2012) - Yukiko Suto
Answer ~ Keishicho Kensho Sosakan TV Asahi / 2012) - Mayuko Mishima (ep.4)
Today is the Best Day | Honjitsu wa Taian Nari (NHK / 2012) - Rumi Asahina
DOCTORS: The Ultimate Surgeon | DOCTORS Saikyou no Meii (TV Asahi / 2011) - Ami Aihara
CSI: Crime Scene Talks Season 1 | Iryu Sosa TV Asahi / 2011) - ep.2
Jin 2 (TBS / 2011) - Princess Chikako Kazunomiya
Kaoruko - Empress of the Night | Jotei Kaoruko  (TV Asahi 2010) - Miki Minamino
Bloody Monday 2 (2010) as Hibiki
Mirai Koshi Meguru (2008)
Asakusa Fukumaru Ryokan 2 (2007)
Kikujiro to Saki 3 (2007)
Kanojo to no Tadashii Asobikata (2007)
My Sweet Home (2007)
Kimi ga Hikari wo Kureta (2006)
Teru Teru Ashita (2006)
Gachi Baka (2006) as Kana Morimoto
Satomi Hakkenden (2006)
Ima Ai ni Yukimasu (2005)
Ame to Yume no Ato ni (2005)
3 nen B gumi Kinpachi sensei 7 (2004)
Denchi ga Kireru Made (2004)
Tōbōsha (2004)
Kokoro (2003)
Ai Nante Irane Yo, Natsu (2002)

Films
 The Last Cop: The Movie (2017) - Saori Kashiwagi
 Love Gear | Koisuru Haguruma (2013) - Risa Fujishima
 Way - Man of the White Porcelain | Michi - Hakuji no Hito (2012) - Mitsue Asada
 hojotachi no Rashinban (2011) - Natsume Hirose
 Pride | Puraido  (2009) - Sayaka Higashino
 Hatsu Kare (2006)
 8.1 (2005)
 Naruto the Movie 2 (2005, voice)
 Kagen No Tsuki~Last Quarter (2004)

TV Dramas

References

External links
Official Profile

21st-century Japanese actresses
1989 births
Actresses from Tokyo
Living people
Horikoshi High School alumni
Asia University (Japan) alumni
Japanese film actresses
Japanese television actresses